Joseph Donald Rosselli (born May 28, 1972) is a former Major League Baseball pitcher for the San Francisco Giants. His record was 2-1 with an 8.70 ERA in nine appearances, five of them starts. He walked 20 batters while striking out just seven.

References

External links

1972 births
Living people
Sportspeople from Burbank, California
Baseball players from California
Major League Baseball pitchers
San Francisco Giants players
Clinton Giants players
Everett Giants players
Phoenix Firebirds players
San Jose Giants players
Shreveport Giants players
Vancouver Canadians players
American expatriate baseball players in Canada